Üsküdar railway station is an underground railway station located beneath Üsküdar square in Istanbul. It was opened on 29 October 2013 along with the new trans-Bosphorus Marmaray rail tunnel. TCDD Taşımacılık operates commuter trains east to Ayrılık Çeşmesi and west to Kazlıçeşme (on the European side) within 6- to 10-minute intervals. Due to the stations central location, connections to several city bus routes are available.

Üsküdar saw over 1.1 million boardings in October 2017, making it the 3rd busiest station on the Marmaray line as well as making up for 20% of all passenger boardings.

Layout

References

Railway stations in Istanbul Province
Railway stations opened in 2013
Üsküdar